Mr. Tire is an American auto service company. The company was founded in 1970 by Joseph Tomarchio Sr. Based out of Rochester, New York, the company provides various automotive repair services across 13 U.S. states.

History 
Mr. Tire was founded in 1970 in Richfield, Minnesota. It distributed CO-OP brand tires and was controlled by Universal Cooperatives. It is a retailers' cooperative. As of 2001, the distributor had 102 affiliated dealers in 13 states.

The second Mr. Tire Auto Service Center was founded in 1970 in Baltimore, Maryland, covering more than 300 locations in Maryland, Delaware, New Jersey, Virginia, North Carolina, South Carolina, New York, Pennsylvania, Ohio, and West Virginia. This organization licensed the "Mr. Tire" name from Universal Cooperatives.

References 

 Article from Tire Business magazine about controversy of dual use of Mr. Tire name, October 23, 2006
 Modern Tire Dealer Top 50
 Mr. Tire (Monro) history

External links 
 Mr Tire / Universal Cooperative web site
 Mr Tire / Monro Muffler Brake web site
 Mr Tire Locations

American companies established in 1970
Retail companies established in 1970
Automotive repair shops of the United States
Retailers' cooperatives in the United States
Companies based in Eagan, Minnesota
Companies based in Baltimore
1970 establishments in Minnesota